The Royal Liberty School is a secondary school for boys aged 11 to 16, located in Gidea Park in the London Borough of Havering, England.

The school is situated on Upper Brentwood Road about 400 metres north of Gidea Park railway station, and approximately halfway between Gidea Park and Ardleigh Green to the north-east of Romford. It is in the parish of St. Michael & All Angels, Gidea Park.

History

Grammar school
The school was founded in 1921 in the buildings at the grounds of Hare Hall and takes its name from the Royal Liberty of Havering. It was once a traditional English grammar school, and also had a sixth form until 1992. In 2017 the school joined the Success for all Education trust.

The Royal Liberty was the first school in Europe to install an electronic computer (an Elliott 903, similar to the 920 military version) in 1965.

As a grammar school, it operated a squadron of the Combined Cadet Force (CCF), incorporating basic, army, navy, and air cadets (including a training glider).

Comprehensive school
 1974 – In accord with government policy, and in spite of manifest opposition, the school converts from a grammar to comprehensive school.
 1989 – J. P. Coles, retired as headmaster after 25 years of service, with L. B. Thomas subsequently promoted from deputy head to headmaster.
 1988 – The sixth form was twinned with the nearby Frances Bardsley Academy for Girls.
 1992 – The sixth form was abolished.
 1996 – School was placed into Ofsted special measures. L. B. Thomas left and S. Berwitz was appointed head.
 2000 – School removed from special measures.
 2001 – School cited by Ofsted as "one of the most improved schools in the UK".
 2003 – Julia Deery was appointed head.
 2004 – Bid launched for specialist school status, hoping to attract additional government funds.
 2006 – School wins bid and becomes a Science College.
 2014 – Julia Deery leaves, with April Saunders becoming head.
 2017 – School coverts to academy status and joins the Success for all education trust
 2022 - April Saunders leaves, with Lee Raftery becoming head.

Houses
The school's houses were previously known as Danes, Normans, Romans and Saxons. Then there was a period where they were known as Darwin, Newton, Rutherford and Salk. They are now known as Discovery, Challenger, Endeavour, Voyager and Apollo to reflect the school's status as a Science College.

Notable former pupils
 Norman Baker, Lib Dem MP for Lewes from 1997 until 2015
 Graham Bond, rock musician
 Nick Butterworth, author and illustrator of children's books
 Andy Day, actor and children's TV presenter for Cbeebies. Star of Andy's Wild Adventures
 Ken Farnes, England cricket fast bowler
 Doug Fisher, actor, Man about the House, London's Burning, The Bitch
 Mick Inkpen, author and illustrator of children's books
 Sir Alex Jarratt CB, chancellor from 1983 to 2002 of the University of Birmingham and president from 1979 to 1983 of the Advertising Association
 Francis Jones MBE, president from 1977 to 1981 of the Engineering Industries Association, co-developer of OBOE bombing system.
 Professor Alan Journet Ph.D. Professor of Biology and Environmental Science, Southeast Missouri State University 1980 - 2010; co-founder and co-facilitator of Southern Oregon Climate Action Now (https://socan.eco)
 Arthur Latham, Labour MP from 1969 to 1974 for Paddington North and from 1974 to 1979 for Paddington
 Sir Timothy O'Shea, principal and vice-chancellor from 2002 to 2018 of the University of Edinburgh
 Andrew Clennel Palmer , pipeline engineer
 Jeff Randall, journalist and business editor of the BBC from 2001 to 2005
 Prof John Saville, historian, professor of economic and social history from 1972 to 1982 at the University of Hull
 Michael Ward, Labour MP for Peterborough from 1974 to 1979
 BERWYN, Trinidad-born rapper, producer and songwriter

References

External links
 The Royal Liberty School for Boys website

Boys' schools in London
Secondary schools in the London Borough of Havering
Educational institutions established in 1921
People educated at the Royal Liberty Grammar School
1921 establishments in England
Academies in the London Borough of Havering